Charlotte Lee may refer to:
 Charlotte Lee, Countess of Lichfield (1664-1718), illegitimate daughter of King Charles II of England and Scotland, and Barbara Villiers
Charlotte Lee, Lady Baltimore (1678-1721), daughter of the above